Cockta is a soft drink from Slovenia. Its main ingredient comes from dog rose hip; the other ingredients come from 11 different herbs, lemon and orange. Its original variant contains neither caffeine nor orthophosphoric acid.

Origins
The origins of the Cockta drink begin in the early 1950s. In 1952, Ivan Deu, the Director of the state-owned corporation Slovenijavino, came up with the idea of producing an original, refreshing Slovenian beverage which would be able to compete against soft drinks from abroad (that is, the United States; i.e. Coca-Cola company and its subsidiary beverage companies), which were not yet being sold in Yugoslavia. The chemical engineer, Emerik Zelinka, an employee of the Slovenijavino research labs, created the drink with a new, different taste, derived from a blend of eleven different herbs and spices; including the rose hip, a prominent flavour within Cockta's blend. The drink was introduced to the market for the first time on 8 March 1953 at a ski jumping competition at Planica.

Ownership
In 2000, the Cockta brand was bought by the Kolinska food company, known today as Droga Kolinska d.d. In mid 2010, Croatian holding company Atlantic Grupa d.d. acquired Droga Kolinska.

Sales
In the first year of production, four million Cockta bottles were sold in Slovenia alone, and ten years later, sales climbed to 71 million. From Slovenia, Cockta spread at the common market  of other republics of Yugoslavia, but no dedicated bottling facilities were established.

Marketing
The initial Cockta launch and marketing campaign was carefully designed. The first bottle and label for Yugo Cockta was created by Sergej Pavlin, then a young architecture student. Pavlin also designed other aspects of the brand's visual image, including the design for Cockta delivery trucks and cardboard packaging for Cockta's bottles.

Many older Slovenes still remember the posters which swept the entire country as part of the original Cockta marketing campaign: they featured a suntanned young woman, with a hairstyle considered trendy at the time, in a ponytail, with blue eyes, holding in her hands a bottle of the new beverage. The sports event at Planica where Cockta was launched was the earliest form of sports sponsorship in Slovenia.

In 2006, Cockta sponsored the MaxCards World Championships, held in Ljubljana.

In 2013 a survey conducted by Valicon placed Cockta 6th in a list of the top 25 strongest brands in Slovenia. Brand strength was calculated based on brand awareness, experience and usage.

In 2019 came into the market's new Cockta free, with no added sugar. Cockta is available in 275ml glass bottles, 330ml cans, 0.5 liter and 1.5 liter plastic bottles. Cockta free is available in 275ml glass bottles, 330ml cans, 0.5 liter and 1.5 liter plastic bottles.

Slogans

 1980 - Pijača vaše in naše mladosti (The Drink Of Your Youth and Ours)
 1983 - Še vedno najboljša (Still the Best)
 2001 - Prve ne pozabiš nikoli (You Never Forget Your First one)
 2002 - Cockte pogrešam (I Miss Cockta, but phonetically is read as How Much I Miss You)
 2005 - Ješ MaxCards, Spiš MaxCards, Piješ Cockto! (You Eat MaxCards, You Sleep MaxCards, You Drink Cockta!)
 Brez kofeina - brez kisline - brez heca! (No Caffeine - No Sour Taste-No Kidding!)
 2012 - Osveži življenje (Freshen [your] life)
 2018 - Cockta za vedno (Cockta Forever)

See also
Polo-Cockta, a drink brand in Poland

References

External links 

 Official website

Slovenian brands
Slovenian drinks
Soft drinks
Cola-like brands
Products introduced in 1953